Joannicius served as Greek Patriarch of Alexandria between 1645 and 1657.

References
 

17th-century Greek Patriarchs of Alexandria